= Space Technology and Applications International Forum =

Space Technology and Applications International Forum (STAIF) was an annual conference organized by the University of New Mexico Institute for Space and Nuclear Power Studies (UNM-ISNPS). From 1984 to 1994 the conference series was titled the Symposium on Space Nuclear Power Systems, but the conference scope was broadened with the 12th symposium in 1995, at which a number of new topics were added. The new name was adopted for the 1996 conference, with the individual symposia as subtopics within the broader conference umbrella. The conference series ended with the 2008 conference.

From 1984 to 1989 (2nd through 6th Symposia) the proceedings were published by Orbit Book Company; from 1991 to 2008, the STAIF proceedings, edited by Distinguished and Regents' Professor of Nuclear, Mechanical and Chemical and Biological Engineering and the Founding Director of the Institute for Space and Nuclear Power Studies Prof. Mohamed S. El-Genk, were published in the American Institute of Physics Conference Proceedings series.

Following the end of the original STAIF conference series, a conference "STAIF II" was organized in 2012, co-sponsored by the American Institute of Aeronautics and Astronautics (AIAA) also in Albuquerque. The STAIF-II conference has continued through 2017 as an annual event, now sponsored by a dedicated non-profit organization, with a stated objective to "sit on the boundary between established science and speculative science," with the proviso that "Speculation must be based upon fundamental scientific principles."
